This article is a list of armed groups involved in the War in Iraq (2013–2017). The war started in 2013, following the 2011–2013 insurgency, and ended in 2017 although it continued as a low-level insurgency. The Islamic State of Iraq and the Levant (ISIL) had a major involvement during the war, until it was militarily defeated in Iraq in December 2017. Baathist supporters and some Sunni groups fought against the Government of Iraq and its allies. The Peshmerga fought against ISIL and other forces during the war; though not against the government, they did not join the Iraqi forces. There are ongoing negotiations related to the future of Iraqi Kurdistan, internal and external conflicts, and the security of the country and the region.

War in Iraq (2013–2017)

Notes
 Ba'athist loyalists and allied Sunni militias mostly attack the Iraqi Army, although there has been a history of fighting with IS dating back to the previous war.
 Fighting between Iraqi government and Kurdish forces broke out in October 2017. Prior to this, the two had worked together against IS, however fighting between Kurdish forces and Turkmen groups in the PMF had occurred sporadically since 2015.
 Coalition forces support both the Iraq government and Kurdish forces against IS, but are not involved in their conflict with one another and have urged for peaceful resolution.
 Turkey supported Kurdish forces against IS until 2017, but have since voiced support for Iraqi forces in their fight against the Kurds.
 The MCIR reportedly has a truce agreement with the Kurdish Regional Government not to target Kurdish territory, in return for the Regional Government's non-interference in the Council creating an autonomous area outside of the control of the current Iraqi government.

See also
 List of armed groups in the Syrian Civil War
 List of armed groups in the Libyan Civil War
 List of armed groups in the Yemeni Civil War
 List of armed groups in the Syrian Civil War spillover in Lebanon
 Combatants of the Iraq War

References

armed groups in the War in Iraq (2013–2017)
War in Iraq (2013–2017)
Iraqi insurgency (2011–2013)
Military history of Iraq